Duke Ellington Meets Coleman Hawkins is a jazz album by Duke Ellington and Coleman Hawkins that was recorded on August 18, 1962, and released in February 1963 by Impulse! Records.

In 1995, The New York Times called it "one of the great Ellington albums, one of the great Hawkins albums and one of the great albums of the 1960s."

Track listing
All tracks composed by Duke Ellington, except where noted.

"Limbo Jazz" – 5:14
"Mood Indigo" (Duke Ellington, Barney Bigard) – 5:56
"Ray Charles' Place" – 4:04
"Wanderlust" (Duke Ellington, Johnny Hodges) – 5:00
"You Dirty Dog" – 4:19
"Self-Portrait (of the Bean)" (Duke Ellington, Billy Strayhorn) – 3:52
"The Jeep Is Jumpin'" (Duke Ellington, Johnny Hodges) – 4:49
"The Ricitic" – 5:51
"Solitude" (Duke Ellington, Eddie DeLange) (1995 CD bonus track)  – 5:51

Personnel
 Duke Ellington – piano
 Coleman Hawkins – tenor saxophone
 Johnny Hodges – alto saxophone
 Harry Carney – baritone saxophone, bass clarinet
 Lawrence Brown – trombone
 Ray Nance – cornet, violin
 Aaron Bell – double bass
 Sam Woodyard – drums

Production
 Bob Thiele – producer
 Rudy Van Gelder – engineer
 Joe Alper – photography
 Jason Claiborne – graphic design
 Stanley Dance – liner notes
 Hollis King – art direction

Reissue
 Michael Cuscuna – liner notes, reissue producer
 Erick Labson – digital remastering

Charts

Notes

Impulse! Records albums
1963 albums
Duke Ellington albums
Coleman Hawkins albums
Albums produced by Bob Thiele
Collaborative albums
Albums produced by Michael Cuscuna